Dickinson v. United States, 346 U.S. 389 (1953), was a case in which the Supreme Court of the United States held there was no basis for denying a petitioner's (a Jehovah's Witness) claim to ministerial exemption from military service, and his conviction for refusing to submit to his local board's induction order was reversed.

Decision of the Court
Justice Clark delivered the opinion of the Court. 

The Court ruled that classification as minister is not available to all members of a sect notwithstanding doctrine that all are ministers; but part-time secular work does not, without more, disqualify member from satisfying the ministerial exemption.

See also
List of United States Supreme Court cases, volume 346

References

External links
 

1953 in United States case law
United States Supreme Court cases
United States Supreme Court cases of the Warren Court
Jehovah's Witnesses litigation in the United States
United States free exercise of religion case law
1953 in religion
Conscription in the United States
Conscription law
Christianity and law in the 20th century